This is a list of members of the twelfth and final legislature of the Supreme Soviet of the Estonian Soviet Socialist Republic which was the Estonian Soviet Socialist Republic's legislative chamber between 1940 and 1941, and between 1944 and 1992. The session ran from 23 March 1990 to 29 September 1992. Elections were held on 18 March 1990; members were elected using the Single Transferable Vote system. This marked the first time since the formation of the Estonian SSR that the Supreme Soviet's elections were open and freely contestable (and the first democratic elections for the country's legislature since 1932).

On 8 May 1990, the name of the body was changed to the Supreme Council of the Republic of Estonia. The Council acted as de facto parliament of Estonia until VII Riigikogu took office on 30 September 1992. The most important legal act of the Council was the Resolution on the national independence of Estonia, adopted on 20 August 1991.

List of members 
Source: Jaan Toomla, Valitud ja Valitsenud: Eesti parlamentaarsete ja muude esinduskogude ning valitsuste isikkoosseis aastail 1917–1999 (National Library of Estonia, 1999), pp. 131–132.

References 

Lists of political office-holders in Estonia